Montcada may refer to:

 Montcada i Reixac, municipality containing the town of Montcada, near Barcelona
 House of Montcada, aristocratic dynasty linked to Montcada i Reixac
Margaret of Montcada viscountess of Béarn (from 1290 to 1310)
 Moncada, Valencia or Montcada, town near Valencia, Spain